The 1933 football season was São Paulo's 4th season since the club's founding in 1930.

Overall
{|class="wikitable"
|-
|Games played || 31 (14 Campeonato Paulista #, 23 Torneio Rio-São Paulo #, 6 Friendly match)
|-
|Games won ||  21 (11 Campeonato Paulista #, 16 Torneio Rio-São Paulo #, 3 Friendly match)
|-
|Games drawn ||  5 (1 Campeonato Paulista #, 3 Torneio Rio-São Paulo #, 2 Friendly match)
|-
|Games lost ||  4 (2 Campeonato Paulista #, 4 Torneio Rio-São Paulo #, 0 Friendly match)
|-
|Goals scored || 109
|-
|Goals conceded || 43
|-
|Goal difference || +66
|-
|Best result || 12–1 (H) v Sírio - Campeonato Paulista - 1933.8.27
|-
|Worst result || 1–3 (A) v Vasco da Gama - Torneio Rio-São Paulo - 1933.9.3
|-
|Top scorer || 
|-

 # 12 Matches valids simultaneously for the Campeonato Paulista and Torneio Rio-São Paulo.

Friendlies

Official competitions

Campeonato Paulista

 # Match valid simultaneously for the Campeonato Paulista and Torneio Rio-São Paulo.

Record

Torneio Rio-São Paulo

 # Match valid simultaneously for the Campeonato Paulista and Torneio Rio-São Paulo.

Record

External links
official website 

Association football clubs 1933 season
1933
1933 in Brazilian football